Joeten-Kiyu Public Library is the State Library of the Commonwealth of the Northern Mariana Islands.

Branches:
 Joeten-Kiyu Public Library (JKPL) - Susupe, Saipan
 Antonio C. Atalig Memorial Rota Public Library - Songsong, Rota
The current library was built circa 2002 but it did not open until its "soft" opening on February 26, 2012. It was named after Mayor of Rota Antonio C. Atalig. It adopted its current name in 1981.
 Tinian Public Library - San Jose Village, Tinian

See also
 Guam Public Library System

References

External links
 State Library of the Commonwealth of the Northern Mariana Islands
 Northern Mariana Islands State Library

Libraries in the Northern Mariana Islands
Public libraries in the United States
State libraries of the United States
Buildings and structures in the Northern Mariana Islands